Templesaghtmacree is an Early Christian church and National Monument located on Inishmaan, Ireland.

Location

Templesaghtmacree is located right in the centre of Inishmaan, the middle Aran Island. It is directly east of the modern Catholic church, the Church of Our Lady and St John.

History
The name is derived from the Irish language, meaning "Church of the Seven King's Sons," commemorating seven men of royal birth who came to Inishmaan as hermits. It was formerly a site of pilgrimage.

Church
A doorway and window are in the south wall. It also contains Leaba Cinndeirge ("Cinndeirg's bed"), grave of an obscure female saint with a cross slab. Tobar Cinndeirge, a holy well, is nearby.

References

Aran Islands
Churches in County Galway
Archaeological sites in County Galway
National Monuments in County Galway
Former churches in the Republic of Ireland